Shorecrest Preparatory School is a private, non-profit, non-sectarian, coeducational, college preparatory day school for students age 3 through Grade 12, located in St. Petersburg, Florida. Founded in 1923, it is the oldest independent day school in the state of Florida.  A PK-12 institution, it serves St. Petersburg as well as the greater Tampa Bay area. The campus is on 28 acres located in St. Petersburg. Shorecrest hosts the school's various sport teams known as the Chargers. 100% of Shorecrest seniors are accepted to college.

The school is a part of the Hybrid Learning Consortium. An online program offering a variety of courses to students around the world. Shorecrest was also recognized by Apple as an Apple Distinguished School for 2016–2024, for the integration of technology throughout the curriculum. Grades 2-12 have a 1:1 Device program. Shorecrest was ranked by Niche as #1 in Best Private High Schools in Pinellas County, Best College Prep Private High Schools in Pinellas County and Best Private High Schools in Pinellas County.

Service
All grade levels at Shorecrest support local, national and international service organizations. The school's commitment to community service is facilitated through a full-time Director of Service Learning, who connects students with on- and off-campus service opportunities and outside organizations, and works with faculty and parent volunteers to plan and implement a year-round Service Learning program.

Athletics
Shorecrest's high school sports generally consist of a Varsity and Junior Varsity team. For the middle school, only one team normally represents grades 6–8; however for more competitive sports, there may be a "Gold" and "Green" team with more experienced athletes playing on the competitive Green team.

Shorecrest Girls Varsity Volleyball won 1A states in 2018, and the Shorecrest Boys Varsity Soccer won 2A states in 2020, after earning runner-up position in the 2019 tournament. In 2021 Shorecrest Chargers Varsity Football put together a victorious gameplan and won the SSAC Florida State Championships.

The following sports are available to boys at Shorecrest:

The following sports are available to girls at Shorecrest:

Arts
The Upper School has over thirty visual and performing art courses. Shorecrest's Thespian Troupe 3140 and Jr. Thespian Troupe 88197 have garnered many top honors at both the District and State levels, including presenting one-acts and mainstage productions at the Florida State Thespian Festival in 2014 and 2015.

Accreditation and memberships 
Shorecrest Preparatory School is accredited or a member of the following organizations: 
 Florida Council of Independent Schools (FCIS)
 National Association of Independent Schools (NAIS)
 Cognia

Notable alumni 
 Patrick Wilson '91; American stage, musical theatre, film and television actor
 Betsy Thomas Rook '76; author of My Grandmother was from Wales and Senator 1876-1965: The Life and Career of Elmer Thomas.
 Monica Raymund '04 won the 2013 Imagen Award for Best Actress in Television. Starred in "Lie To Me" and "Chicago Fire".
 The 2015-16 Shorecrest Alumni Distinguished Achievement Award went to Dr. Michael Ison '89, a physician working in transplants and infectious diseases at Northwestern University in Chicago.
 John McQueen '83; was president and CEO of Anderson-McQueen Funeral Homes, the largest family owned funeral business in the state of Florida, and gives lectures on customer service. He is also the co-author of Lessons From the Dead: Breathing Life Into Customer Service.
 Dr. Laurie Butler '77;  Laurie attended University of California, Berkeley, where she did her thesis research on electronic state-selective photochemistry and received her Ph.D. Laurie has been a professor in the Department of Chemistry and The James Franck Institute at the University of Chicago. In addition to her work as a professor and researcher, Laurie has co-authored over 100 research publications, including a number of chemistry textbooks, used in classrooms across the world.

References

External links 
Official site

High schools in Pinellas County, Florida
Private elementary schools in Florida
Private high schools in Florida
Private middle schools in Florida